Wearmouth Bridge is a through arch bridge across the River Wear in Sunderland. It is the final bridge over the river before its mouth with the North Sea.

Original bridge

The original Wearmouth Bridge was designed by Thomas Paine and opened in 1796. In 1805 the bridge was repaired, and between 1857-1859 it was reconstructed by Robert Stephenson.

History
To accommodate the growing volume of traffic, construction began on the current bridge in 1927. It was designed by Mott, Hay and Anderson and fabricated by the famous bridge building firm of Sir William Arrol & Co. at their Dalmarnock Ironworks in Glasgow (they also built the famous Forth Rail Bridge and the steel structure of Tower Bridge in London). The new bridge was built around the old one to allow the road to remain open. It was opened on 31 October 1929 by the Duke of York (who would later become King George VI).

The cost of the bridge amounted to £231,943 of which £12,000 was spent on dismantling the old bridge.

The adjoining Monkwearmouth Railway Bridge was built in 1879, and extended the railway south from Monkwearmouth to the centre of Sunderland.

The bridge carries the A183 road between Chester-le-Street and South Shields and the A1018 which was the old route of the A19 until the bypass was built leading to the Tyne Tunnel. It is a Grade II listed building.

Gallery

References

External links 

 Wearmouth Bridge over River Wear
 Image gallery at BBC Wear

Bridges across the River Wear
Bridges completed in 1929
Bridges in Tyne and Wear
Through arch bridges in the United Kingdom
Transport in the City of Sunderland
Grade II listed buildings in Tyne and Wear
Grade II listed bridges
Former toll bridges in England
Sunderland